Alsarah (Arabic: السارة) (born 1982) is a Sudanese-American singer, songwriter, and ethnomusicologist. She is the leader of the group Alsarah & the Nubatones, and has performed with other groups such as The Nile Project. Her stage name is a combination of her given name with the Arabic definite article.

Early life
Alsarah was born in Khartoum, Sudan. Both her parents are human-rights activists. When she was eight, her family fled the country during the 1989 coup by future president Omar al-Bashir to avoid being killed as dissidents. They then lived in Taez, Yemen, before fleeing again due to the country's 1994 civil war. They subsequently arrived in the United States claiming political asylum and settled in Boston. During this turbulent period, she often found solace in music, listening to bootleg recordings in Yemen and taking casual piano lessons from a family friend.

In the United States, she sang in several world music choirs and attended high school at Pioneer Valley Performing Arts Charter Public School. She studied ethnomusicology at Wesleyan University, where she wrote her senior thesis on Sudanese Zār music.

Career
After graduating in 2004, she moved to New York City and began singing professionally in Arabic, supporting herself with various odd jobs. She was the singer for the Zanzibari band Sound of Tarab.

Alsarah & the Nubatones

Alsarah formed Alsarah and the Nubatones in 2010, with her sister, Nahid, on backing vocals, bassist Mawuena Kodjovi, oudist Luthier Haig Manoukian (replaced by Brandon Terzic after his death), and percussionist Rami El-Aasser of the Cafe Antarsia Ensemble.

They released their debut recording, Soukura EP, in 2014, followed by the full-length album Silt later that year. The song "Soukura", which appears on both albums, received a music video that was released on March 25, 2014. They have toured Hungary, Portugal, France, the United Arab Emirates, Morocco, Egypt, Lebanon, Sweden, and Lithuania.

Other work

In 2010, she released a music video called "Vote!", featuring rapper Oddisee, to encourage Sudanese citizens to vote in the country's upcoming election. She collaborated with American oudist and rabbinical student Zach Fredman on the album One Bead (2012), the debut from his group The Epichorus.

In 2013, she released the album Al Jawal, a collaboration with French producer Débruit, released through Soundway Records. She performed at Waayaha Cusub's Reconciliation Music Festival, the first music festival in Mogadishu in 20 years. She contributed the song "Salaam Nubia" to Mina Girgis and Meklit Hadero's Nile Project album Aswan, which was recorded during a live performance in Aswan, Egypt.

She was featured in the 2014 documentary Beats of the Antonov, which won the People's Choice Award for Best Documentary at the 2014 Toronto International Film Festival.

Artistry
Alsarah has listed Hamza El Din and Abd El Gadir Salim among her favorite Nubian and Sudanese artists. She has also mentioned Lebanese singer Fairuz, American folksinger Joan Baez, and Yemeni and Balkan music as part of her musical development, and has described her work with the Nubatones as "soul music from East Africa".

Discography

Solo albums
Aljawal ("Eternal Traveler") (2013, Soundway) (with Débruit)

With Alsarah & the Nubatones
Silt (2014, Wonderwheel Recordings)
Soukura EP (2014, Wonderwheel)
Manara ("The Lighthouse") (2016, Wonderwheel)

Music videos
"Soukura" (2014)
"Habibi Taal" (2014)
"Ya Watan" (2016)

With The Epichorus
One Bead (2012)

Other credits
The Nile Project, Aswan (2013) – featured artist ("Salaam Nubia")
Captain Planet, Esperanto Slang (2014) – featured artist ("Safaru")
Dexter Story, Wondem (2015) – composer, featured artist ("Without an Address")

References

External links

Living people
1982 births
People from Khartoum
Musicians from Brooklyn
Ethnomusicologists
Wesleyan University alumni
21st-century Sudanese women singers
Sudanese women anthropologists
Sudanese emigrants to the United States
Sudanese refugees
Political refugees in the United States
Arabic-language singers
21st-century African-American women singers